Aron Stuart Singh Nijjar (born 24 September 1994) is an English cricketer who plays for Essex County Cricket Club. Primarily a left-handed Slow left-arm orthodox bowler, he also bats left-handed. He made his  First-class debut for Essex against Leicestershire in May 2015. He made his Twenty20 debut for Essex in the 2018 t20 Blast on 17 August 2018.

Despite consistent performances with bat and ball in the Essex 2nd XI, the excellence and uninterrupted availability of spin-bowling all-rounder Simon Harmer has limited Nijjar's appearances for the Essex first team.

References

External links
 

1994 births
Living people
English cricketers
Essex cricketers
Cardiff MCCU cricketers
Suffolk cricketers
British sportspeople of Indian descent
British Asian cricketers
English people of Indian descent
People from the London Borough of Redbridge
Cricketers from Greater London
English cricketers of the 21st century